Arabia Deserta (Latin meaning "Abandoned/Deserted Arabia"), also known as Arabia Magna ("Great Arabia"), signified the desert interior of the Arabian peninsula. In ancient times, this land was populated by nomadic Bedouin tribes who frequently invaded richer lands, such as Mesopotamia and Arabia Felix.

Arabia Deserta was one of three regions into which the Romans divided the Arabian peninsula: Arabia Deserta (or Arabia Magna), Arabia Felix, and Arabia Petraea. As a name for the region, it remained popular into the 19th and 20th centuries, and was used in Charles M. Doughty's Travels in Arabia Deserta (1888).

Bibliography 
 G.W. Bowersock, "The three Arabias in Ptolemy's geography" and "Arabs and Saracens in the Historia Augusta" in G.W. Bowersock, Studies on the Eastern Roman Empire, Goldbach, 1994.
 F. Millar, The Roman Near East, London, 1994, pp. 514 ff.

References

Historical regions in Saudi Arabia
Arabia